Programmed to Love is the debut album from the electronica chillout duo Bent, released in 2000. The album contains various styles of electronica music and samples.

Release

The album was released in several versions. According to AMG, the European version of the album was released 5 September 2000, while amazon.com claims that a "new version (import)", which refers to the European version, was released August 2 that same year. The American version was released 23 October 2001. Confusingly, AMG uses the American track list in the album article, although they use the European cover art and supposed release date. Some versions also contain a track called "Chocolate Wings".

Track listing

Charts

References

Bent (band) albums
2000 debut albums
Ministry of Sound albums